Paweł Korzeniowski (born 9 July 1985) is a Polish competitive swimmer who won the 200-meter butterfly at the 2005 World Aquatics Championships in Montreal. He also competes in the freestyle events.

Initially trained by Paweł Woźnicki in Oświęcim-based Unia Oświęcim club, in 2005 he was transferred to Warsaw-based AZS AWF Warszawa club, where he has been trained by Paweł Słomiński. His current coach, since 2009, is Robert Bialecki.

Notable achievements
 2001
 European Youth Olympic Festival – silver in 200m butterfly
 2002
 European Junior Championships – silver in 1500m freestyle
 2003
 World Championships – 8th in 1500m freestyle
 European Short Course Championships – bronze in 200m butterfly
 European Junior Championships – gold in 200 m butterfly, bronze in 400m freestyle
 2004
 European Short Course Championships – silver in 200m butterfly, bronze in 400m and 200m freestyle
 Olympic Games – 4th in 200m butterfly
 2005
 World Championships – gold in 200m butterfly
 Universiade – gold in 200m butterfly
 2006
 European Championship (50m pool) – gold in 200m butterfly
 2012
 London Olympics – Placed 3rd in the second 200m butterfly semi-final, and 7th overall to reach the final.

References

External links
 

1985 births
Living people
People from Oświęcim
Polish male butterfly swimmers
Olympic swimmers of Poland
Swimmers at the 2004 Summer Olympics
Swimmers at the 2008 Summer Olympics
Swimmers at the 2012 Summer Olympics
Swimmers at the 2016 Summer Olympics
Polish male freestyle swimmers
World Aquatics Championships medalists in swimming
Medalists at the FINA World Swimming Championships (25 m)
European Aquatics Championships medalists in swimming
Universiade medalists in swimming
Sportspeople from Lesser Poland Voivodeship
Universiade gold medalists for Poland
Universiade bronze medalists for Poland
Medalists at the 2005 Summer Universiade
Medalists at the 2009 Summer Universiade
Medalists at the 2011 Summer Universiade
Medalists at the 2013 Summer Universiade
Swimmers at the 2020 Summer Olympics
21st-century Polish people